Roger Evans  (born 17 November 1879) was a Welsh international footballer. He was part of the Wales national football team, and was capped once for a match on 22 February 1902 against Ireland. At the time he was playing for Clapton.

See also
 List of Wales international footballers (alphabetical)

References

External links
 
 

1879 births
Welsh footballers
Wales international footballers
Place of birth missing
Date of death missing
Clapton F.C. players
Association football forwards